Cees van Espen (born 28 May 1938) is a retired Dutch road bicycle racer. He rode the Tour de France in 1964 and 1965, and won the fifth stage in 1965.

Major results

1962
Ronde van Twente
1963
Tour de Canada
1964
Ossendrecht
1965
Oldenzaal
Tour de France:
Winner stage 5
Zundert
1966
Putte-Mechelen

External links 

Official Tour de France results for Cees van Espen

Dutch male cyclists
1938 births
Living people
Dutch Tour de France stage winners
Sportspeople from Arnhem
Cyclists from Gelderland